Prince August Fredrik zu Sayn-Wittgenstein-Berleburg, known professionally as August Wittgenstein, (born 22 January 1981) is a German-Swedish actor and member of the princely House of Sayn-Wittgenstein-Berleburg. Wittgenstein has appeared in English, German, and Swedish language films, starring in the 2013 German television movie Desert Heart - The Trip of My Life. He is known for his portrayals of Georg Donatus, Hereditary Grand Duke of Hesse in The Crown and Count Alfred Eckbrecht von Dürckheim-Montmartin in Ludwig II as well as his roles as Karl Tennstedt in Das Boot and Andreas Wolf in Deadwind.

Early life and education 
Wittgenstein was born on 22 January 1981 in Siegen, North Rhine-Westphalia and is a member of the House of Sayn-Wittgenstein-Berleburg, an old German noble family. He is the younger son of Prince Ludwig Ferdinand of Sayn-Wittgenstein-Berleburg and Countess Yvonne Wachtmeister af Johannishus, a member of the Swedish nobility. His paternal grandparents were Prince Ludwig Ferdinand of Sayn-Wittgenstein-Berleburg and Princess Friederike Juliane of Salm-Horstmar. He is the great-grandson of Richard, 4th Prince of Sayn-Wittgenstein-Berleburg and Princess Madeleine of Löwenstein-Wertheim-Freudenberg.  Wittgenstein is the brother of the journalist and writer Princess Anna of Bavaria and of Princess Theodora zu Wittgenstein. He grew up speaking both German and Swedish and is a dual citizen.

When he was fifteen, Wittgenstein attended a boarding school in Sweden. After completing school, he lived in the United Kingdom, Paris, and Australia. He later graduated from Georgetown University. From 2005 until 2007 he studied acting at the American Academy of Dramatic Arts.

Career 
Wittgenstein started his acting career in 2008 with some roles in short films. In 2009 he had a role as a Swiss Guard in the film Angels & Demons. In 2011 he had a supporting role in the Swedish drama Avalon. He portrayed Count Alfred Eckbrecht von Dürckheim-Montmartin in the 2012 German feature film Ludwig II. In 2013 he played the role of Travis in the science fiction drama The Congress.

In 2013 Wittgenstein landed his first starring role in the German television movie Desert Heart - The Trip of My Life. He played the role of Georg Donatus, Hereditary Grand Duke of Hesse in The Crown. He has also had roles in Das Boot, Die Schlikkerfrauen, Ein starkes Team: Späte Rache, In Your Dreams, Notruf Hafenkante, Deadwind, Leipzig Homicide, Cologne P.D., SOKO München, Nord bei Nordwest, Ein Lächeln nachts um vier, Ku'damm 56, Jenny – echt gerecht, and Josephine Klick – Allein unter Cops.

Personal life 
In 2021, Wittgenstein and Austrian psychologist and podcaster Mia Rohla became engaged. She is the daughter of the Austrian businessman and television personality Martin Rohla. They have got married on 3 September 2022 in Vienna.

References 

Living people
1981 births
21st-century German male actors
21st-century Swedish male actors
American Academy of Dramatic Arts alumni
Georgetown University alumni
German male film actors
German male television actors
German princes
August
People from Siegen
Swedish male film actors
Swedish male television actors